Spirostyliferina lizardensis is a species of sea snail, a marine gastropod mollusk in the family Litiopidae.

The specific name lizardensis is according to the Lizard Island, its type locality.

Distribution
Distribution of Spirostyliferina lizardensis includes Lizard Island, Great Barrier Reef, Australia.

Description

References

 Bandel K. 2006. Families of the Cerithioidea and related superfamilies (Palaeo-Caenogastropoda; Mollusca) from the Triassic to the Recent characterized by protoconch morphology – including the description of new taxa. Paläontologie, Stratigraphie, Fazies (14), Freiberger Forschungshefte, C 511: 59–137

Truncatelloidea
Gastropods described in 2006